The first time R.S.C. Anderlecht qualified for European football was in 1955. The last time they were in European football is in 2022. In that time-frame they have won 5 titles in European football. They won the Uefa Cup in 1983, the Cup Winners' Cup in 1976 and 1978, and the Super Cup in 1976 and 1978. In total, Anderlecht have played 415 games with a win percentage of 45.30% across all European football competitions. They have competed in 61 seasons in European football. R.S.C. Anderlecht are by far the most successful football club in Belgian football history.

European record
Updated 16 March 2023

Pld = games played, W = won, D = drawn, L = lost, GF = goals for, GA = goals against.

Matches

Summary of Anderlecht's best reults in European competitions 
From the quarter-finals upwards:

(5 cups) + (4 finals)

European Cup/UEFA Champions League:
- semi-finalists in 1982 EC1 and 1986 EC1
- quarter-finalists in 1963, 1966, 1975, 1987 and 1988
- group stage (last 8) in 1991/1992*, 1993/1994, 2000/2001
UEFA Cup Winners' Cup (2) + (2):
- winners in 1976 and 1978
- finalists in 1977 and 1990
UEFA Cup/UEFA Europa League (1) + (2):
- winners in 1983
- finalists in 1970 Inter-Cities Fairs Cup and 1984
- quarter-finalists in 1991, 1997, and 2017
UEFA Super Cup (2):
- winners in 1976 and 1978

*in the 1991–92 and 1992–93 seasons, there were no semi-finals after the group stage.

UEFA club coefficient ranking
Club ranking for 2016–17 European season (Previous year rank in italics, UEFA Club Coefficients in parentheses)
 36  (67)  VfL Wolfsburg (56.035)
 37  (36)  Dnipro Dnipropetrovsk (55.476)
 38  (41)  Anderlecht (54.000)
 39  (31)  Rubin Kazan (52.216)
 40  (33)  Sporting CP (51.616)

Records
 Most goals in European competition: Rob Rensenbrink, 33
 First European match: Vörös Lobogó 6–3 Anderlecht in the European Cup, 7 September 1955
 First goal scored in Europe: René Vanderwilt against Vörös Lobogó, 7 September 1955
 Biggest win: Anderlecht 10–1 Haka, in the European Cup, 14 September 1966
 Biggest defeat: Manchester United 10–0 Anderlecht in the European Cup, 26 September 1956
 Highest European home attendance:

Notes

References

Europe
Belgian football clubs in international competitions